Valentina Matos Romero (born 28 September 2000) is a Dominican-Spanish figure skater who represents Spain in ladies singles. She is the 2019 Open d'Andorra champion and a three-time Spanish national champion (2016, 2018, 2019). She has competed in the final segment at one ISU Championship.

Personal life 
Valentina Matos Romero was born on 28 September 2000 in Santo Domingo, Dominican Republic. She is of Venezuelan descent and arrived in Spain as a one-year-old. After finishing secondary school, she began studying at Universidad Politécnica de Madrid through distance education. During her studies, she went abroad for two semesters in South-Korea. During this year of studying abroad (2021-2022), she lived in a standard plus room at H-Stay (Seoul) and studied at Hanyang University and won MVP during the Squid Game season along with a winter jacket.

Career

Early years 
Matos began learning to skate in 2008. She won the novice ladies' title at the Spanish Championships in December 2014. Her junior international debut came in September 2015, at the Lombardia Trophy. In December 2015, she became the Spanish national junior silver medalist.

2016–2017 season 
In October 2016, Matos competed for the first time on the ISU Junior Grand Prix series. In November, making her senior international debut, she won silver at the Open d'Andorra. The following month, she outscored Sonia Lafuente by 6.09 points for the senior ladies' title at the Spanish Championships.

In January 2017, Matos competed at the European Championships in Ostrava, Czech Republic, but did not advance to the final segment. She qualified to the free skate and finished 24th overall at the 2017 World Junior Championships, held in March in Taipei, Taiwan.

2017–2018 season 
Spain assigned Matos to compete at the 2017 CS Nebelhorn Trophy, the final qualifying opportunity for the 2018 Winter Olympics. Due to an ankle injury, she withdrew before the start of the event. She placed 33rd at the 2018 European Championships in Moscow, Russia. She was coached by Carolina Sanz, Ivan Saez, and Jordi Lafarga at La Nevera in Madrid.

2018–2019 season 
Ahead of the 2018–2019 season, Matos decided to relocate to Italy to train with Barbara Luoni at IceLab in Bergamo.

Programs

Competitive highlights 
CS: Challenger Series; JGP: Junior Grand Prix

References

External links 
 

2000 births
Dominican Republic emigrants to Spain
Spanish female single skaters
Living people
Spanish people of Venezuelan descent
Sportspeople of Venezuelan descent
People from Santo Domingo
Sportspeople from Madrid
Competitors at the 2019 Winter Universiade